Baqi Siddiqui (1905 - 1972) was a Punjabi, Pothohari, and Urdu poet from Pakistan. He is known for his 'ghazal', "Daagh e Dil Humko Yaad Anay Lagay".

Early life and career
Baqi Siddiqui was born as Muhammad Afzal on December 20, 1905, in Saham village in Rawalpindi, Punjab, British India. His father was a servant in North Western State Railway. After completion of his matriculation, Baqi worked as a school teacher for a brief time. In 1932, he moved to Bombay (now Mumbai) and worked as an actor and dialogue writer in the film industry. In 1940, he joined the British Army but resigned sooner. After coming back to his native town, he became associated with Radio Pakistan, Rawalpindi for next eighteen years and penned many Pothohari songs for its broadcasts.

Baqi started his poetic career in 1928 by reciting his poetry in social gatherings (Mushairas). He adopted "Baqi Siddiqui" as a pen name. In the beginning, he did poetry in Punjabi but later he also wrote poetry in Urdu. He developed close friendship with Urdu poets like Mohsin Ehsaan, Shoukat Wasti, Ahmed Faraz, Raza Hamdani, Ehsan Danish, Abdul Hameed Adam, and others. His first collection of poetry, Jaam e Jam, was published in 1944. His last two books, "Kitni Der Chiragh Jala" and "Zaad e Rah", were published posthumously in 1977 and 1984.

Personal life
Baqi never married and spent most of his life living with and supporting his younger divorced sister Asghari Khanum.

Books
 Jaam e Jam (1944) (A collection of poems and ghazals)
 Daar o Rasan (1951)
 Zakham e Bahar (1961) (A collection of ghazals)
 Kachay Ghharray (1967) (Pothohari poetry)
 Kitni Der Chiragh Jala (1977)
 Zaad e Rah (1984) (Nasheeds)

Death
Baqi died on January 8, 1972, in Rawalpindi and was buried in his native town graveyard.

See also
List of Pakistani poets

References

1908 births
1972 deaths
Pakistani poets
Urdu-language poets from Pakistan
20th-century poets